Kaldur'ahm, or Kaldur for short, is the superhero codenamed Aqualad and Aquaman in media published by DC Entertainment. The character was created by Brandon Vietti, Greg Weisman and Phil Bourassa for the television series Young Justice, and voiced by Khary Payton. His name is a reference to the character Cal Durham (the character's foster father), formerly a henchman of the supervillain Black Manta (the character's biological father) who was sent to infiltrate Atlantis, but defected to the Atlanteans. While originally developed for television, DC quickly adapted the character to its mainstream comic books, with Geoff Johns and Ivan Reis' re-interpreting the  character. For television, creators were able to tell a story where Aqualad had known and worked with Aquaman for many years, while the comic book version had to be introduced to Aquaman and readers at the same time, meaning aspects of his backstory had to be changed.

Debuting under the name Jackson Hyde in Brightest Day #4 (August 2010), months ahead of his television debut, the character's history and background differs from the animated counterpart. In the comics, Jackson (birth name Kaldur'ahm) was originally born to an unnamed Xebellian woman and Black Manta in the Kingdom of Xebel, the young infant granted powers due to extraordinary circumstances. As an infant, he is saved by a younger Mera, who leaves him on the surface and arranges for him to be adopted. When he and his adoptive family were targeted by forces from the extradimensional realm, Aquaman protects him and his family. When he learns his true origins, he decides to help Aquaman. Eventually, he adopts the Aqualad name and becomes a sidekick of Aquaman and a member of the Teen Titans.

In 2016, years after The New 52 and during DC Rebirth, Jackson Hyde was re-introduced as an openly gay teenager and is the son of Black Manta and Lucia, a Xebellian elite and former member of Xebel's honor guard who was once seduced by Black Manta with promises of a life outside Xebel. The character would begin working as a member Teen Titans, adopting the Aqualad alias (per a request from Tempest) similar to his prior comic version. Later, the character sought mentorship in Aquaman and began working alongside him and Mera while being supported by his mother. In Aquaman: The Becoming, the character would first use the Aquaman codename concurrently with Arthur Curry, the two depicted as partners.

Fictional character biography

Young Justice version
In the Young Justice animated series, Aqualad (voiced by Khary Payton) was first seen as the protege of Aquaman. He was later unanimously elected by the team to be their leader after their first mission together, as he was perceived as having good leadership skills. In-between seasons one and two of the series, he uncovered he was in fact the son of Black Manta. Because the character was originally created for the animated series before being brought into Brightest Day, he has a different origin from his comic book counterpart, including being a citizen of Atlantis who developed his powers in a year studying Atlantean sorcery. Though he still maintains the birth name of Kaldur'ahm, he does not use the Jackson Hyde alias created for the comics. He is portrayed as the most mature member of the group. The episode "Downtime" reveals that he and his friend Garth had saved Aquaman's life during a battle with Ocean Master. Aquaman offered to take on both teens as his proteges, but Garth chose to remain in Atlantis to continue his studies in sorcery, while Kaldur chose to travel with Aquaman and become Aqualad. He also had an interest in a girl named Tula, who became involved with Garth after Kaldur left Atlantis.

In season two, titled Young Justice: Invasion set five years later, Kaldur is working undercover with Black Manta, for Nightwing to find out who the Light's partner is. In the episode "Depths," Black Manta sends Kaldur and the Manta Men to disrupt a satellite launch at Ferris Aircraft, where he and Nightwing fake Artemis' death to put her undercover as Tigress. In "Darkest", Aqualad, Tigress, and a team of super villains track Impulse and Blue Beetle to Mount Justice, captures them, along with Beast Boy, and destroy Mount Justice with a bomb. It is later revealed that he secretly gave Nightwing a tracking device (which corresponds to a tracker that he injected Lagoon Boy with). In "Before the Dawn", Miss Martian confronted and mind ravaged Aqualad as revenge for his supposed killing of Artemis, but drops into a state of guilt when she learns about his and Artemis' undercover mission. Artemis arrived, shocked by what Miss Martian had done, and escapes with a catatonic Aqualad. Artemis manipulates Black Manta into capturing Miss Martian to repair Kaldur's mind. After Miss Martian succeeds, Aqualad pretends to remain catatonic to keep Black Manta from killing her and arrange for her to escape. Later, during a summit between the Light and the Reach Ambassador and Black Beetle, Artemis' and Aqualad's cover is revealed and Miss Martian, disguised as Deathstroke, fakes their deaths. Aqualad subsequently reveals the Light's enduring betrayal of the Reach via a hologram and he and Artemis and Miss Martian reveal their play. During a substantial conflict between the Light, the Reach, and the gathered forces of the Team which had infiltrated the Light's foot-soldiers, Aqualad defeats Black Manta and it is soon after revealed he had also been the one to defeat Deathstroke. He is made leader of the team again by Nightwing, who soon leaves in the wake of Wally's death during the defeat of the Reach in the season 2 finale.

In the third season, titled Young Justice: Outsiders, Kaldur becomes the new Aquaman after the original retired. As the new Aquaman, Kaldur'ahm becomes the leader of the Justice League with Wonder Woman as his co-chair. Later in the season, he takes an aquatic meta-girl he saved to Atlantis. Kaldur is also revealed to be in a relationship with an Atlantean man named Wyynde, who previously appeared in the Young Justice comic book series as a former follower of the Ocean-Master, thus confirming his polysexuality.

He appears in the Young Justice: Phantoms episode "Tale of Two Sisters", in where he informs Artemis that Connor has died. He has an arc in the second half. He laters grows a beard. Kaldur eventually relinquishes the title of Aquaman.

Comic books

A different version of the character debuted in Brightest Day #4 (August 2010), which coincided with the appearance of Aqualad in the 2010 Young Justice animated series. Although similar to his animated counterpart, the comic book incarnation of the character features key differences from the animated version, originating from the underwater kingdom known as Xebel, making him of Xebellian descent like the character, Mera. The character's set of powers also differs from his animated counterpart, his powers telepathic in nature in tandem with his natural physiology instead of being mystical and lacks inherent magical powers.

Pre-Flashpoint

Earlier life 
A teenager from Silver City, New Mexico, Jackson Hyde was taught by his parents to fear water since he was young; they do not want him near it because his true parents would be able to locate him, not to mention certain changes happen to Jackson when he gets in the water. Jackson has kept this secret hidden for years, lying to his girlfriend about being afraid of drowning, being unable to swim and being in the dark about the mysterious tattoos he's had since birth. Aquaman is later contacted by the Entity, which tells him to locate Jackson before a second unidentified group, which is speculated to be Siren and her Death Squad.

Brightest Day 
Jackson Hyde and his on-and-off again girlfriend Maria are first drawn into the events of Brightest Day after witnessing Deadman, Hawk and Dove activating the White Lantern Battery, which had landed in Silver City after the events of Blackest Night. As the Battery begins to speak to the heroes, the tattoos on Jackson's right arm begin to glow. Jackson is seen outside his house during a rainstorm, where he displays his abilities for the first time. As he started to control the water from the rain, his tattoos and eyes began glowing. At this moment he is revealed to possess gills and webbed hands. It is also revealed that Black Manta is actually his real father, and that Mera also has some sort of connection to him. After witnessing Jackson in the rain, his adoptive father takes him to a cottage by the sea. He tells him that Mera had given Jackson to him, asking that he keep him away from his parents, and he was given an Atlantean chest to be opened when the truth is discovered. Before the chest can be opened, Black Manta, along with Siren and her Death Squad, attacks. Jackson (using his ability to create hard water constructs) defends his adoptive father, but cannot stop Black Manta from shooting a trident-shaped dart at him. Jackson's adoptive father would have died if not for Aquaman's intervention, who blocks and crushes the dart.
 
Aquaman gets Jackson and his foster father to safety where everything is explained to them. The chest is opened, which activates a map. Using the map, the two discover a sealed chest that only Jackson can open. Once the chest is opened, Jackson is shown a recording from Mera, who explains that his father and mother had been kidnapped and tortured by the people of Xebel (an extradimensional Atlantean penal colony) while exploring the Bermuda Triangle, where the gateway to the colony is located. Xebel's king had ordered that the child, the first "outsider" born there in centuries, be experimented on to serve as a key that would finally free them from their exile. Fearing for the child's safety, Mera had stolen the infant and brought him to the surface world, where she subsequently gave him to the foster family that ended up raising him. She also reveals his true name; Kaldur'ahm. Once the recording is over, Jackson discovers several items which Mera had left for him, notably a soldier's uniform from Xebel and a pair of "Water Bearers", metallic constructs that help him control his water-manipulation abilities.

Aquaman and Jackson ultimately end up in Miami, Florida, where Black Manta and Siren are leading an army of warriors from Xebel in a full-scale invasion. Jackson successfully uses his waterbearers to create blades, which he uses to fight off the attacking troops, and even briefly holds his own in a duel with Siren. After Black Manta severs Aquaman's right hand, Jackson attacks his father and berates him for siding with the people who killed his own wife, only for Black Manta to throw Jackson to the ground and coldly states that both he and his mother mean nothing to him. Just as Black Manta is about to impale his son with one of his blades, Mera arrives with Aquagirl, who saves Jackson by kicking his father square in the face. After using his bio-electrical abilities to cauterize Aquaman's wound, Jackson and Mera are able to work together to seal Black Manta, Siren, and the rest of the invaders away in the Bermuda Triangle. As the heroes celebrate, Jackson is shown to begin harboring a crush on Aquagirl. Afterwards, Mera tells Aquaman that Jackson wants to continue his training. Aquaman informs her that he has already contacted the Titans.

Teen Titans: Team Building 
After Damian Wayne joins the Teen Titans, a vision of Jackson arriving at Titans Tower and confronting Superboy, Wonder Girl, Beast Boy and Kid Flash is shown as part of a collage of future events that will affect the team.

Rebirth 
In the DC Rebirth timeline, the Jackson Hyde version of the character is reintroduced as a gay teenager, and visually looks more like his Young Justice counterpart. It is mentioned that he displays a near superhuman talent for swimming. Aqualad joined the Teen Titans after the team encounters him while exploring the San Francisco Bay for a mission.

Powers and abilities

Young Justice version 
Kaldur'ahm is granted various powers through his Atlantean-based hybrid physiology, possessing superhuman strength, durability, enhanced senses, capability to breathe underwater and swim at fast speeds, and one mentioned to have resistance towards poisons. In addition to his natural abilities, the character trained in the mystic arts in the Conservatory of Sorcery, his magic indicated by the eel-shaped skin icons. With his magical abilities, he can generate electricity, bend and shape water at will, create hard-water constructs, and utilize spell-casting.

In addition to his powers, Kaldur is an expert combatant and is considered a capable tactician and leader, having led both the Team and later became the chairman of the Justice League. He is also extremely duplicitous, having manage to position himself within the clandestine organization, the Light, as a double agent and was able to create and perform complex manipulations and plans to maintain his position.

Comic book version 
Due to his hybridized Xebellian physiology, Jackson is capable of living and breathing underwater, possessing superhuman strength, superhuman durability, and enhanced senses (allowing him to see in the dark). Due to his Xebellian heritage, he is also capable of generating electricity in a manner similar to an electric eel as well as manipulating and shaping water at will similarly to characters like Mera and Siren, his powers being telepathic in nature (unlike his Young Justice counterpart, in which are magical). Sometime after adopting the Aquaman name, the character's hydrokinetic prowess is depicted as being at a higher level, the character being proficient enough to manipulate blood within an individual.

In addition to his powers, the character is also a skilled combatant, having received training from Robin (Damian Wayne) and Aquaman (Arthur Curry).

Other versions
 A version of Aqualad appears as a part of the Ubernet Teen Titans/Justice League in the pages of Red Robin.
 Jackson Hyde appears as Aqualad in the prequel comic to Injustice 2, where he's agreed to represent the oceans and joins Batman's efforts to repair the world after Superman's tyranny. However, he is later revealed to be allied with Ra's al Ghul and assassinates the president after Blue Beetle accidentally destroys a number of endangered species in Ra's' reserve.
 DC Comics released the original graphic novel You Brought Me the Ocean on June 16, 2020. Written by Alex Sánchez and drawn by Jul Maroh, the story focuses on Jake Hyde's teenage years in Truth or Consequences, New Mexico and learning to cope with his father's drowning while also struggling with his sexuality, future college plans, and burgeoning superpowers. Kirkus Reviews praised You Brought Me the Ocean as "a worthy, diverse addition to the DC Universe". The graphic novel was nominated for the 32nd GLAAD Media Awards (2021) for Outstanding Comic Book. On April 8, 2022, it was announced the graphic novel will be adapted as a live-action series that will be released on HBO Max.

In other media

Television
 Aqualad appears in the Teen Titans Go! episode "Let's Get Serious", voiced by Khary Payton. In the episode, which is a crossover with Young Justice, he accompanies Superboy and Miss Martian in taking out H.I.V.E. as the Titans were too silly to do it properly.
 Aqualad appears in Mad episode 45, in a segment that parodies Teen Titans with Titanic.
 An Aqualad live-action series for HBO Max starring Jake Hyde, a gay teenager, is in development. Charlize Theron, A.J. Dix, Beth Kono and Andrew Haas of Denver & Delilah Films are executive producers for the series.

Film
 Kaldur'ahm makes a cameo appearance in Justice League: The Flashpoint Paradox as a member of Aquaman's army in an altered timeline. They battle Deathstroke and kill him and his crew. Kaldur'ahm later reappears in the final battle with the Amazons. Aquaman is killed by Wonder Woman, but he sets off the Atlantean doomsday device before he dies. This device (a captive Captain Atom) presumably kills all the survivors of the battle preceding, including Kaldur'ahm.

Video games
 Aqualad appears as a playable character in Young Justice: Legacy, which is set between the first and second seasons of Young Justice. Khary Payton reprises the role.
 Aqualad appears as an unlockable playable character in Lego DC Super-Villains.
 Aqualad appears in DC Universe Online. 
 Aqualad appears in DC Legends.

References

External links
 World of Black Heroes: Aqualad Biography
 Comicvine: Aqualad
 

African-American superheroes
Comics characters introduced in 2010
Characters created by Geoff Johns
DC Comics Atlanteans
DC Comics characters who can move at superhuman speeds
DC Comics characters who use magic
DC Comics characters with superhuman senses
DC Comics characters with superhuman strength
DC Comics LGBT superheroes
DC Comics hybrids
DC Comics sidekicks
DC Comics child superheroes
DC Comics television characters
Fictional bisexual males
Fictional characters from New Mexico
Fictional characters with electric or magnetic abilities
Fictional characters with energy-manipulation abilities
Fictional characters with water abilities
Fictional double agents
Fictional gay males
Superheroes who are adopted
Young Justice
Teenage characters in comics
LGBT characters in animated television series
Young Justice (TV series)